The Squatter's Son is an Australian film completed in 1911 and directed by E. I. Cole.  It was based on a play which Cole and his company had performed throughout Australia.  The Squatter's Son was filmed at locations "in the vicinity of Melbourne".  It is considered a lost film.

Plot
John Lenton is a squatter who lives at Wilunga. The villainous Dudley Ward also works there. Ward is masquerading at Lenton's nephew, who was murdered overseas by Ward.

Lenton's father refuses to give his son permission to marry Violet Gartson, the woodchipper's daughter. Joe Garston is given £200 by old Lenton to take Violet away from the station. Jack is disinherited by his father for refusing to give up Violet.

Dudley Ward murders Jack's father with Jack's knife. Jack arrested for his father's murder but charge "not proven." Joe Garston, who knows Dudley Ward is the murderer, scorns his offer to marry Violet.

Joe drugged and dragged away to the scrub. Violet finds a letter proving Dudley Ward to be the murderer. Ward's bushranging gang carry Violet off to the Gap. Little Cecil Lenton's birthday. Dudley Ward, who in case of Cecil's death becomes the heir, tries to murder the little chap. Exciting rescue. Jack Lenton falls into the hands of the bushrangers. The denouement; virtue rewarded and vice punished.

Original Play
In 1910 the play was described as "the most famous" of Cole's "repertoire of pieces". It was often revived throughout Cole's career.

The film was told in 25 scenes with the main characters being two cousins.

Reception
The Geelong Advertiser said of the film "the drama is most sensation and exciting and well portrayed. It had a decidedly Australian flavor, embracing as it does every phase of bush life, from the squatter to the sundowner and the blackfellow. In addition to the sensationalism the fun was fast and furious and kept the large and appreciative audience in a continued state of laughter."

According to the Perth Sunday Times the film's (unnamed) star "is a magnificent type of the Australian bushman. During the action of the photographic drama, the chief artist rides, shoots, fights and swims and hews trees, he being a handsome, muscular athlete who was specially selected for his splendid qualities. He is, or was, a tip-top amateur actor, but is now being rushed with engagements by Eastern managers."

References

External links
 
 The Squatter's Son at AustLit

1911 films
1911 Western (genre) films
1911 lost films
Australian black-and-white films
Lost Australian films
Lost Western (genre) films
Silent Australian Western (genre) films